Chega Mais is a Brazilian telenovela that premiered on 3 March 1980 replacing Marron Glacê at the traditional 7 pm timeslot. It is created by Carlos Eduardo Novaes, and directed by Gonzaga Blota, Walter Campos, Roberto Vignati and Reynaldo Boury.

Cast

Connection with Marron Glacê
It is revealed in the first chapter of Chega Mais that this telenovela takes place in the same universe as its predecessor at 7 pm timeslot on Rede Globo, Marron Glacê: the buffet hired for the wedding of Antônio "Tom" Barata and Gelly Maia is the same buffet which was the main scenario that bears the name of the previous soap opera, "Marron Glacê" and in which four of the characters who were members of this buffet appeared in the first chapter of Chega Mais: the protagonist of Marron Glacê and the owner of the buffet, Clotilde or Madame Clô (Yara Cortes) and three of her most important and loyal employees,  Oscar (Lima Duarte), the oldest waiter at Marron Glace and trusted man to Madame Clô; Luís César (João Carlos Barroso), a waiter infamously known for being a playboy-style flirt who also works as a boom operator in his spare time and Valdomiro (Laerte Morrone), a maitre d' who is notoriously known for being the toughest, sternest and most feared employee in the entire buffet.

References

Brazilian telenovelas
TV Globo telenovelas
Television shows set in Rio de Janeiro (city)